The 2001 World Men's Curling Championship (branded as 2001 Ford World Men's Curling Championship for sponsorship reasons) was held March 31 to April 8, 2001, at the Malley Sports Centre in Lausanne, Switzerland.

Teams

Round-robin standings

Round-robin results

Draw 1

Draw 2

Draw 3

Draw 4

Draw 5

Draw 6

Draw 7

Draw 8

Draw 9

Playoffs

Brackets

Final

References
 

Curling Championship
Curling Championship
Sports competitions in Lausanne
World Men's Curling Championship
International curling competitions hosted by Switzerland
International sports competitions hosted by Switzerland
March 2001 sports events in Europe
April 2001 sports events in Europe
21st century in Lausanne